Aterpia monada is a species of moth of the family Tortricidae first described by Józef Razowski in 2013. It is found on Seram Island in Indonesia. The habitat consists of upper montane forests.

The wingspan is about 19 mm. The forewings are pale brownish ferruginous, but whitish subterminally. There is a white discal spot and the suffusions and strigulation (fine streaks) are darker than the ground colour. The markings are ferruginous brown with dark brown spots. The hindwings are pale brown grey, but more cream and strigulated brown grey at the apex.

Etymology
The species name refers to the absence of the signum and is derived from Greek monas or monados (meaning a unit).

References

Moths described in 2013
Olethreutini
Moths of Indonesia